Kolaba Lok Sabha constituency was a Lok Sabha (parliamentary) constituency in  Maharashtra state in western India till 2008. The area which comprised this erstwhile constituency was part of Raigad district.

Assembly segments
Kolaba Lok Sabha constituency comprised the following six Vidhan Sabha (legislative assembly) segments:
 Shriwardhan
 Man
 Pen
 Alibag
 Panvel
 Khalapur

Members of Parliament

Election results

See also
 Raigad district
 Raigad Lok Sabha constituency
 List of former constituencies of the Lok Sabha

References

Politics of Raigad district
1962 establishments in Maharashtra
Former Lok Sabha constituencies of Maharashtra
Former constituencies of the Lok Sabha
2008 disestablishments in India
Constituencies disestablished in 2008